Lubok Antu District (Malay: Daerah Lubok Antu) is a district in the Sri Aman Division of the state of Sarawak, Malaysia. It borders on Indonesia and a Malaysian border crossing checkpoint is located here. The checkpoint on the Indonesian side is called the Nanga Badau Border Crossing Checkpoint located in the village of Badau, West Kalimantan. The seat of Lubok Antu District is the town of Lubok Antu.

Population
The district has about 42,000 people; they are predominantly Ibans, and there are also some Chinese residents. Most residents make their living from farming (shifting cultivation).

Geography
The Batang Ai river runs through the district. There is a suspension bridge which leads to the village of Kampung Pasir. A dam completed in 1985 caused the displacement of thousands of people when their homes were flooded. In 2018 a suspension bridge at Nanga Kesit collapsed because of flooding.

Government
Lubok Antu is governed by the Lubok Antu District Council which is a local government organisation formed under the State Government's Local Authorities Ordinance, 1956. The council has the right to implement council by-laws from enactments and ordinance as approved by the State Government which, includes taxation, rentals and finance autonomy.

The council consists of a chairman, or a chairperson, a vice-chairman, and 26 council members who are appointed by the Yang Dipertua Negeri Sarawak under section 12, Local Authorities Ordinance, 1996.

Transport

Bus Express

Climate
Lubok Antu has a tropical rainforest climate (Af) with heavy to very heavy rainfall year-round.

Villages 
 
 
Sebeliau

References 

 
Indonesia–Malaysia border crossings